Janry Ubas (born January 2, 1994) is an Filipino athlete.

A Misamis Oriental native, He is a bronze medalist for men's heptathlon at the 2023 Asian Indoor Athletics Championships in Kazakhstan. Ubas clinched the medal by garnering 5,246 points – a national record. He also set a new national record in long jump with a record of 7.66m.

References

 

1994 births
Filipino heptathletes
Sportspeople from Misamis Oriental
Athletes (track and field) at the 2018 Asian Games
Southeast Asian Games medalists in athletics
Competitors at the 2017 Southeast Asian Games
Competitors at the 2015 Southeast Asian Games
Asian Games competitors for the Philippines
Filipino male decathletes
Filipino male long jumpers
Competitors at the 2019 Southeast Asian Games
Competitors at the 2021 Southeast Asian Games
Southeast Asian Games silver medalists for the Philippines
Southeast Asian Games bronze medalists for the Philippines
Living people